Alien  ( Otary) is an Armenian romantic melodrama television series. The series started on Shant Premium on March 13, 2017. It premiered on Shant TV on September 18, 2017 and airs every workday at 8:00 (PM).

Most of the series took place in Yerevan, Armenia.

Premise 
Gor, Neneth and Arsen are close friends and they study in the same school. Each of them has their own feelings that are not open even for the closest friends. When Gor finds out about the love between Arsen and Neneth, everything changes cause he is also in love with her. Along with that, Gor's father gets arrested for unknown reasons. From now on the boy will be burdened with the responsibility of taking care of the family. Confronted with difficulties early in life, Gor has a fateful choice to make: to become the reason of Neneth and Arsen's separation, or to free the way for his friend? The story woven around Gor's, Arsen's and Neneth's parents is a dark curtain hiding the most unexpected secrets. The film is a story unfolding around the love triangle of the three characters in which the heroes will have to fight for happiness, understanding that nothing is given without a fight.

Cast and characters

Main Cast
Gayane Balyan
Hovak Galoyan
Ruzan Mesropyan
Suren Tumasyan
Nelli Kheranyan
Sisian Sephanyan as Gor
Marinka Khachatryan as Neneth
Davit Aghajanyan as Arsen
Davit Hakobyan
Mariam Adamyan
Murad Nadiryan
Marianna Gevorgyan
Robert Hakobyan
Luiza Karapetyan as Maya
Ani Petrosyan
Armen Margaryan

References

External links
 
 

Armenian-language television shows
Armenian drama television series
Shant TV original programming
2010s teen drama television series
Serial drama television series
2010s Armenian television series
2017 Armenian television series debuts